The ornate numbfish (Narcinops ornatus) is a species of electric ray within the family Narcinidae. It is endemic to northern Australia, inhabiting waters in the Timor and Arafura Seas near Cape Londonberry, The Kimberley, Western Australia, and the western side of Cape York. It is a benthic species, found on continental shelves at depths of 48 to 132 meters below sea level.

Biology 
Female ornate numbfish can grow up to 24.1 centimeters in length, while males mature at around 17 to 18 centimers in length. Females also may reach maturity at 17 to 18 centimeters in length as well. The surface is covered in dark brownish pink spots, with some of these spots joined together creating longitudinal stripes on the middle disc. The underside of the species is white. The diet of the ornate numbfish consists of small invertebrates on the seafloor.

Conservation 
The main threat of the ornate numbfish is commercial fishing which can directly or indirectly modify its habitat. The species occurs in a region home to Australia's largest prawn fishery, the Northern Prawn Fishery (NPF), although it has not been reported in bycatch extensively. This is likely due to the species inhabiting depths over 50 meters and not being affected by trawling from the NPF, as well as having a distribution exceeding fishing areas. It has been classified as 'Least concern' by the IUCN Red List, and no specific conservation efforts have been made towards the species.

References 

Fish described in 2008
Narcinidae
Fish of Australia
IUCN Red List least concern species